The 1956–57 British National League season was the third season of the British National League (1954–1960). Five teams participated in the league, and the Wembley Lions won the championship.

British National League

Regular season

Autumn Cup

Results

References

External links
 Nottingham Panthers history site

British
1956 in English sport
1957 in English sport
1956–57 in British ice hockey
1956 in Scottish sport
1957 in Scottish sport